Miss Colombia 2006, the 72nd Miss Colombia pageant, was held in Cartagena de Indias, Colombia, on November 12, 2006, after three weeks of events.  The winner of the pageant was Eileen Roca Torralvo, Miss Cesar.

The pageant was broadcast live on RCN TV from the Centro de Convenciones Cartagena de Indias in Cartagena de Indias, Colombia. At the conclusion of the final night of competition, outgoing titleholder Valerie Dominguez Tarud crowned Eileen Roca Torralvo of Cesar as the new Miss Colombia.

Results

Special awards
 Miss Photogenic (voted by press reporters) - María Isabel Arango Alzate (Risaralda)
 Best Body Figura Bodytech- Laura Montoya Escobar  (Antioquia)
 Miss Elegance - Eileen Roca Torralvo (Cesar)
 Best Face - Isabel Cristina Agudelo Orozco  (Caldas)
 Reina de la Policia - Kelly Johanna Ballesteros Castellanos (Norte de Santander)
 Señorita Puntualidad - Sabrina Parra Agudelo (Caqueta)

Delegates
The Miss Colombia 2006 delegates are:

Antioquia - Laura Montoya Escobar
Atlántico - Carolina Ruiz De Castro
Bogotá - Diana Marcela Acosta Albarracín
Bolívar - Jennifer Emilia Lemus Yidia
Caldas - Isabel Cristina Agudelo Orozco
Caquetá - Sabrina Parra Agudelo
Cartagena DT y C - Said Karime Char Tinoco
Cauca - Diana Marcela Zúñiga Paredes
Cesar - Eileen Roca Torralvo
Chocó - Katy Lorena Mosquera Mena
Córdoba - Katherine Estella Quintero Gómez
Cundinamarca - Lady Johana Rincón Páez
Guajira - Ana Milena Lamus Rodríguez
Huila - Natalia Tamayo Palacio
Meta - Mónica Esperanza Palacios Mora
Norte de Santander - Kelly Johanna Ballesteros Castellanos
Quindío - Laura Marcela Fernández Zuluaga
Risaralda - María Isabel Arango Alzate
San Andrés and Providencia - Kathrinne Alexandra Hawkins Brito
Santander - Carolina María León Mendoza
Sucre - Mileth Johana Agámez López
Tolima - Adriana Lucía Barragán Londoño
Valle - Stephany Ospina Tenorio

References and footnotes

External links
Official site

Miss Colombia
2006 in Colombia
2006 beauty pageants